The Margaret Pendergast House is a home in Savannah, Georgia, United States. It is located in the northeastern civic block of Warren Square, and was built by 1868. It is part of the Savannah Historic District, and was built for Margaret Pendergast. The home is a three-storey brick structure.

In a survey for the Historic Savannah Foundation, Mary Lane Morrison found the building to be of significant status. It was restored in the 20th century by Anne and Mills Lane, who also lived there. It was the Lanes' first of many restorations in Savannah. Their son, Mills IV, later changed the stoop and added a side porch.

Margaret Pendergast
Margaret Pendergast was born Margaret Ann Gray on July 31, 1817, in Whitemarsh Island, Georgia, to Tobias V. Gray and Ann Margaret Hartstein. When Margaret was eight years old, her mother drowned in the Savannah River, leaving Margaret as the lady of the house and to take care of her three-year-old brother, George.

At the age of 16, she married Pierce Butler Pendergast on February 6, 1834, at the Lutheran Church of the Ascension. Living at 20 East St. Julian Street, they had two children: Margaret Ann and Susan Robertson. Pierce died on April 15, 1850.

Margaret died on July 6, 1872, aged 54, of hypertrophy. She is buried in Laurel Grove Cemetery in Savannah, alongside her brother and his family. It is not known where her husband was buried, but it is possible his body was lost during the transition of the Old Brick Cemetery to Laurel Grove.

See also
Buildings in Savannah Historic District

References

External links
Margaret Pendergast – Find a Grave

Houses in Savannah, Georgia
Houses completed in 1868
Warren Square (Savannah) buildings
Savannah Historic District